Elazığ Botanical Park (Turkish: Elazığ Botanik Park) is the first Botanical Park at the central and eastern parts of Turkey.

Geography 
The  park is at the western part of the center of Elazığ. It is surrounded by Abdullah Paşa District to the west, Sport Center to the north, High School to the east and, Gazi Caddesi to the south.

History 
As the growth of the city of Elazığ step by step site surrounded by the high density residential buildings. At 2009 Municipality of Elazığ established Elazığ Botanical Park  and opened to the public.

Design 
Elazığ Botanical Park was designed on 2007 by Turkish landscape architect Serpil Öztekin Erdem.

References 

Parks in Elazığ
Urban public parks
1943 establishments in Turkey